Besarion Vardzelashvili (born 27 October 1976) is a Georgian boxer. He competed in the men's light welterweight event at the 1996 Summer Olympics.

References

1976 births
Living people
Male boxers from Georgia (country)
Olympic boxers of Georgia (country)
Boxers at the 1996 Summer Olympics
Sportspeople from Tbilisi
Light-welterweight boxers
20th-century people from Georgia (country)